Alfredo Marte (born March 31, 1989) is a Dominican professional baseball left fielder for the New Jersey Jackals of the Frontier League. He has played in Major League Baseball (MLB) for the Arizona Diamondbacks and Los Angeles Angels of Anaheim.

Career

Arizona Diamondbacks
In 2011, Marte was suspended for testing positive for Stanozolol, a performance-enhancing drug. Marte represented the Diamondbacks at the 2012 All-Star Futures Game. After the 2012 season, the Diamondbacks added him to their 40-man roster. On April 2, 2013, Marte made his major league debut against the St. Louis Cardinals, recording no hits in 3 at-bats. He appeared in 22 games for Arizona in 2013, hitting .186/.271/.256 with no home runs and 4 RBI in 43 at-bats. In 2014, Marte appeared in 44 contests, slashing .170/.221/.292 with 2 home runs and 9 RBI in 106 at-bats.

Los Angeles Angels
The Los Angeles Angels of Anaheim claimed Marte on waivers from the Diamondbacks on October 7, 2014.

In 2015, he spent some time up with Los Angeles but would be optioned down to the Salt Lake Bees on June 2.

Baltimore Orioles
On December 14, 2015, Marte signed a minor league deal with the Baltimore Orioles. He did not make the team out of spring training and was sent to AAA.

Philadelphia Phillies
On April 18, 2016, Marte was traded from the Orioles for a player to be named later or cash to the Philadelphia Phillies. He was released by the Phillies on May 16.

York Revolution
On May 27, 2016, Marte signed with the York Revolution of the Atlantic League of Professional Baseball.

Bravos de León
On March 30, 2017, Marte signed with the Bravos de León of the Mexican Baseball League. He was released on May 23, 2017.

New Jersey Jackals
On April 11, 2019, Marte signed with the New Jersey Jackals of the Can-Am League. He posted a career year, batting .311/.388/.531 and leading the league in home runs (16), RBIs (88), doubles (29), and extra-base hits (45). He helped lead the Jackals to the 2019 Can-Am League Championship Series, where they defeated the Sussex County Miners and won their first ever league crown. Marte was later named the 2019 Can-Am League Player of the Year. 

Following the 2020 season, the Can-Am League merged into the Frontier League. Marte later signed a contract extension with the Jackals, but the 2020 season was canceled due to the COVID-19 pandemic.

Marte re-signed with the Jackals for the 2021 season. In 38 games, he slashed .281/.348/.493 with 7 home runs and 29 RBIs.

Pericos de Puebla
On July 15, 2021, Marte's contract was purchased by the Pericos de Puebla of the Mexican League. He appeared in 18 games, slashing .275/.311/.507 with 4 home runs and 12 RBIs. Marte was released following the season on October 20, 2021.

New Jersey Jackals (second stint)
On March 10, 2022, Marte signed with the New Jersey Jackals of the Frontier League.

References

External links

1989 births
Living people
Águilas Cibaeñas players
Arizona Diamondbacks players
Baseball players suspended for drug offenses
Bravos de León players
Dominican Republic expatriate baseball players in Mexico
Dominican Republic expatriate baseball players in the United States
Dominican Republic national baseball team players
Los Angeles Angels players
Major League Baseball players from the Dominican Republic
Mexican League baseball left fielders
Mobile BayBears players
New Jersey Jackals players
Pericos de Puebla players
Reno Aces players
Salt Lake Bees players
Sportspeople from Santo Domingo
South Bend Silver Hawks players
Southern Maryland Blue Crabs players
Visalia Rawhide players
Yakima Bears players
York Revolution players
2019 WBSC Premier12 players
Dominican Summer League Diamondbacks players
Estrellas Orientales players
Gigantes del Cibao players
Navegantes del Magallanes players
Dominican Republic expatriate baseball players in Venezuela